Khleborobnoye is a rural locality (a selo) and the administrative center of Khleborobny Selsoviet, Bystroistoksky District, Altai Krai, Russia. The population was 797 as of 2013. There are 11 streets.

Geography 
Khleborobnoye is located on the Anuy River, 35 km southeast of Bystry Istok (the district's administrative centre) by road. Smolensky is the nearest rural locality.

References 

Rural localities in Bystroistoksky District